In the postwar decades, the standard of living in Japan has undergone a dramatic rise. Some observed changed has been a reduction of the gap between blue and white collar workers. What was once considered the "three sacred treasures", was possessed by 90% of households by 1964. By the 1970's, the living conditions of the working class were considered to be as high as those in the West. Japanese consumers have benefited from the nation's economic growth, while in turn they have stimulated the economy through demand for sophisticated products, loyalty to domestically produced goods, and saving and pooling investment funds. But personal disposable income has not risen as fast as the economy as a whole in many years—at 1 percentage point less than average GNP growth in the late 1980s.

Overview
The postwar years in Japan witnessed a steady rise in the average Japanese standard of living, together with a narrowing of differentials between blue-collar and white-collar workers. The wage gap between the two groups was considerably reduced, bonuses were established and raised for blue-collar workers, welfare facilities were made available to all employees, and the permanent employment guarantee was made available to regular blue-collar workers.

Three signs of affluence in the post-war period were the “three sacred treasures”, a television, a fridge, and a washing machine, and by 1964, 90% of households possessed all “three sacred treasures”. Most families had sought to equip themselves with these  luxury items, and in the years that followed, consumer demand increased significantly. From 1951 to 1967, for instance, the percentage of paid radio subscriber households rose from 58.6% to 93.4%, while from 1952 to 1970, the percentage of paid television subscriber households rose from 0.01% in 1951 to 94.% in 1970. By 1970, 98% of all employee households owned a washing machine, 95% a gas or electric refrigerator, 80% a vacuum cleaner, 77% a camera, and 67% to 70% a television set.

Collectively, trade unions (which engaged each year in a “spring offensive” to settle wages and bonuses) helped the bulk of the Japanese population to a share in the affluence brought by the expansion of national production. Real wages in manufacturing were nearly 50% higher in 1960 than they had been in 1934-36 (which was taken to be the prewar norm). In the next ten years they grew by another 80%, while those in commerce grew only a little more slowly. From 1955 to 1980, the amount of the average household budget spent on food fell from 44.5% to 27.8%, while the proportion spent on medical care, rent, and clothing also dropped, leaving more money for non-essentials such as extra education, consumer durables, and leisure.

According to William G. Beasley, Japanese living standards were in many ways “undoubtedly impressive by the 1980s: high real wages, low unemployment rates, excellent health care, above average consumption of goods and services”. Nevertheless, a 1986 white paper found that in matters affecting the quality of life, Japan still lagged behind America and Europe. Nearly 75% of all power lines in Tokyo were still above ground, while only just over one-third of homes were connected to sewers. In 1985, only 36% of Japanese households had access to sewage facilities, compared with 65% in France (1975) and 97% in the United Kingdom (1976). Per capita park space in central Tokyo was only 2.2 square metres, compared with between 30 and 50 square metres in Washington, London, and Bonn. The ratio of roads to total area was also low in central Tokyo at 14%, compared with 17% in London and 20% in Paris.

Despite the hard work and sacrifice that have made Japan one of the wealthiest nations in the world, many Japanese felt they are "a rich nation, but a poor people". Such a negative view of the economy is prompted by the fact that the average consumer had to pay for goods and services that are much cheaper elsewhere. In spite of these negative perceptions, however, average living standards improved sharply in the 1970s and 1980s, and real household expenditures did rise during Japan's economic growth. The new national wealth created by the post-war economic boom was also evenly distributed amongst the Japanese people, which left almost no one in an economic lower class. In addition, the level of unemployment remained low. The living standards of most working-class Japanese also rose considerably during the postwar era, with real wages more than doubling from 1965 to 1975. In the seventies, average living standards in Japan rose to be as high (depending on the measurement) as anyone living in the West.

By August 1960, 9 out of 10 urban households had a radio, almost half had an electric washing machine and an electric fan, and more than half had a television set. By the late Seventies, however, 99.4% of all households had refrigerators, 98.7% owned washing machines, 97.7% had colour television sets, and 53.4% possessed motor cars. By the early 1980s, most Japanese enjoyed to “to the full the fact that they possessed amenities and advantages befitting a society as advanced as any on Earth.” The annual income of the average Japanese family had increased to $20,000, about 40% of all homes were equipped with microwave ovens or air conditioners, more than 8 out of 10 families had electric sewing machines, 2 out of 3 families owned a passenger car and at least one tape recorder, and more than 99% of all households contained colour television sets and refrigerators. By the mid-1980s, Japanese real wages were estimated to be at least 60% to 80% of real wages in the United States. Some 90% of Japanese came to regard themselves as middle class, and Japanese workers had come to be regarded as amongst the best paid in the world. According to International Labour Organization statistics, Japanese workers in manufacturing in 1984 earned an average of ¥989.99 per hour. In addition, according to a 1989 study on Japanese society, a comparison based on the (then) current value of the yen revealed that Japanese workers were now earning more per hour than their American counterparts.

Japan’s high level of economic growth in the postwar period was also accompanied by a rapid redistribution of income, while social policies such as the occupation land reform (together with LDP rural patronage and rice price support) improved the quality of life for farmers, and reduced the numbers of rural Japanese migrating to urban areas. For those who did migrate, however, the employment situation was favorable. As noted by Ikuo Kabashima:

The share of total family living expenses devoted to food dropped from 35% in 1970 to 27% in 1986, while net household savings, which averaged slightly over 20% in the mid-1970s, averaged between 15 and 20% in the 1980s. Japanese households thus had greater disposable income to pay for improved housing and other consumer items. The increase in disposable income partly explained the economic boom of the 1980s, which was pushed by explosive domestic demand, as well as a sharp rise in the value of the yen after the Plaza Accord.

Japanese income distribution in the 1980s, both before and after taxes, was among the most equitable in the world. An important factor in income distribution is that the lower income group is better off than in most industrialized countries. The economic crisis of the 1990s diluted this picture somewhat, increasing the unemployment rate (to 4.0% in 2006).

The collapse of the Japanese asset price bubble brought a phenomenon called the Lost Decade, with reimporters and discount chains bringing down inflated prices for food and consumer goods, especially electronics. Today Tokyo is still one of the most expensive cities in the world, but the difference in living expenses between Japan and other industrialized nations is nowhere near the level of the 1980s.

Today, the majority of Japanese employees not only enjoy job security and access to a range of occupational benefits, but a very high standard of living as well. In addition, despite having a social security system that is less generous than that which exists in most developed countries, Japan has an egalitarian distribution of income that bears comparison with Scandinavia. As noted by one historian,

“Clearly Japan has developed its own indigenous version of economic and socials security which, arguably, offers social protection comparable to the advanced welfare states of Europe”.

As noted by Kenichi Ohmae in the early Nineties,

“The standard of living has increased steadily over the past forty years; more than 90 percent of the people consider themselves middle class and reasonably happy about their life.”

In summing up Japan’s social and economic achievements, Jeff Kingston has noted that

"Postwar Japan has experienced success in reconstructing a war-ravaged nation, raising living standards, renovating democracy, taming militarism and rejoining the community of nations. This far-reaching rehabilitation of Japan marks an extraordinary achievement and has led to significant advances in the lives of Japan’s citizens. It is stunning that despite this whirlwind of tumultuous and deracinating transformation, Japan has preserved and augmented its social capital and avoided the worst of the scourges that plague other advanced industrialized nations. The relative absence of deep cleavages in society, the highly developed sense of community and success in containing the dislocation and social ills and modernization are a source of considerable strength in Japan. People are better housed, better educated, healthier, live longer and are, by virtually any yardstick, better off than their predecessors and most other people in the world. They have enjoyed political stability, economic security, low crime, good health care, decent schools, adequate housing and an extraordinary level of public politesse.

Housing

Even though the percentage of residences with flush toilets jumped from 31.4% in 1973 to 65.8% in 2008, this figure was still far lower than in other industrialized states. In some primarily rural areas of Japan, it was still under 30% at that time. Even 9.7% of homes built between 1986 and 1988 did not have flush toilets.

In the metropolitan areas, houses are built extremely close to each other, with narrow straps of green doubling for a garden, if any. Apartment buildings with ten to twenty floors can be found even in suburbs. While lacking space, these houses offer all other amenities.

The cost of Japanese housing differs a lot between urban and rural areas. The asset price bubble of the 1980s inflated land prices in the metropolitan areas, but have stabilized since the early 1990s at about 50% of the peak. In the cities, housing is still expensive relative to annual income, even though the high cost is somewhat offset by low interest rates. Large companies often offer subsidies to their employees to pay for housing.

Food
The Westernization of many areas of Japanese life includes consuming a diversity of foods. After World War II, Japanese dietary patterns changed and came to resemble those of the West. Many Japanese still prefer a traditional breakfast of boiled rice, miso soup, and pickled vegetables (tsukemono).

Average intake per day was 2,084 calories and 77.9 grams of protein in the late 1980s. Of total protein intake, 26.5% came from cereals (including 18.4% from rice), 9.6% from pulses, 23.1% from fish, 14.8% from livestock products, 11% from eggs and milk, and 15% from other sources.  The government inaugurated several policies to switch to non-rice crops, but they met with limited success and rice remained in oversupply (see agriculture, forestry, and fishing in Japan). As a downside, the percentage of the childhood population which are overweight has increased.

A negative aspect of Japan's economic growth is industrial pollution. Until the mid-1970s, both public and private sectors pursued economic growth with such single-mindedness that prosperity was accompanied by severe degradation of both the environment and the quality of life (see environmental protection in Japan).

Savings

Typically, Japanese consumers have been savers as well as buyers, partly because of habit. However, by 1980, the consumer credit industry began to flourish. Younger families are particularly prone to take on debt. Housing is the largest single item for which consumers contracted loans. In 1989, families annually borrowed an estimated US$17,000 or about 23% of their average savings. Those who wished to buy houses and real estate needed an average US$242,600 (of which they borrowed about US$129,000).

But many families in the 1980s were giving up the idea of ever buying a house. This led many young Japanese to spend part of their savings on trips abroad, expensive consumer items, and other luxuries. As one young worker put it, "If I can never buy a house, at least I can use my money to enjoy life now". As credit card and finance agency facilities expanded, the use of credit to procure other consumer durables was spreading. By 1989, the number of credit cards issued in Japan reached virtual parity with the population.

Japanese families still feel that saving for retirement is critical because of the relative inadequacy of official social security and private pension plans. The average family in 1989 had US$76,500 in savings, a figure far less than what is needed to cover the living expenses for retired individuals, although official pensions and retirement allowances did help cover the financial burdens of senior citizens. The annual living expenses for retired individuals in 1989 were estimated at US$22,800. About half of this was from government pensions and the rest from savings and retirement allowances. Senior citizens in their seventies had the largest savings, including deposits, insurance, and negotiable securities worth an estimated US$113,000 per person. In 1989, individuals in their twenties had savings amounting to US$23,800 and salaried workers in their thirties had US$66,000 in savings.

Consumer products
The Japanese consumer benefits most from the availability of compact, sophisticated consumer products that are often popular exports. Consumer electronics, clothing, automobiles, and household appliances are high-quality items that Japanese industry provided in quantity. There are 45 million cars in Japan, for a ratio of 350 cars per 1000 people. The Japanese rail system was ranked the world's most advanced in a recent OECD development report.

Ownership of consumer durables by percentage of households

Source: Economic Planning Agency, Economic Manual, 1986

Comparison
A Japanese social scientist ranked Japan among a group of ten other industrialized nations, according to a list of variables. Data was from the mid-1970s to the late 1980s and Japan was rated better than average in terms of overall income distribution, per capita disposable income, traffic safety and crime, life expectancy and infant mortality, proportion of owner- occupied homes, work stoppages and labor unrest, worker absenteeism, and air pollution. Japan was below average for wage differentials by gender and firm size, labor's share of total manufacturing income, social security and unemployment benefits, weekly workdays and daily work hours, overall price of land and housing, river pollution, sewage facilities, and recreational park areas in urban centers. Some of these variables, especially pollution and increased leisure time, improved in the 1980s, and, in general, living standards in Japan were comparable to those of the world's wealthiest economies.

Growing inequality
Over the past two decades or so, inequality in Japan has grown as a result of economic difficulties that Japan has faced since the end of the economic boom of the 1980s. This problem has been characterised by a rise in the percentage of the workforce employed on a temporary or part-time basis, from 19% in 1996 to 34.5% in 2009, together with an increase in the number of Japanese living in poverty. According to the Organisation for Economic Co-operation and Development, the percentage of people in Japan living in relative poverty (defined as an income that is less than 50% of the median) rose from 12% of the total population in the mid-Eighties to 15.3% in 2000. In 2005, it was estimated that 12.2% of children in Japan lived in poverty. From 1985 to 2008, the percentage of non-regular workers (those working on fixed-term contracts without job security, seniority wage increases, or other benefits) rose from 16.4% to 34.1% of the workforce. Various observers have come to describe Japan as a “disparity society”, a socially divided society with stark class differences and inequalities (in a country where around 90% of the population have regarded themselves to be middle-class in various surveys). The rise in income inequality in Japan arguably contributed to the election of the Democratic Party of Japan in 2009, which promised to reduce socio-economic inequalities through policies such as an expanded welfare system. Despite these problems, the average standard of living in Japan remains amongst the highest in the world.

See also
Economy of Japan

References

  - Japan

Economy of Japan
Society of Japan
Japan